Copadichromis likomae is a species of haplochromine cichlid which is endemic to Lake Malawi. It forms schools and feeds on zooplankton.

References

likomae
Fish described in 1960
Taxonomy articles created by Polbot